Sri Sarada Math is named after Sri Sarada Devi, the consort of Sri Ramakrishna, and founded on 2 December 1954. Built by a group of eight sadhavis, as per the instructions given by Swami Vivekananda, it serves as a monastic order for women. Headquartered at Dakshineshwar, Kolkata, the organisation has branch centres all over India, in Sri Lanka and Australia. The nuns of this order use the title "Pravrajika" before their ordained name, and are usually addressed as "Mataji" meaning 'revered mother'.

Overview 
Sri Sarada Math is the monastic order for women established as an independent counterpart to Ramakrishna Order. The main aim of the organisation is to fulfill the mission of Swami Vivekananda, that is ‘Shiva Jnane Jiva Seva’ serving God in Man, irrespective of caste, creed, and nationality as well as the upliftment and empowerment of women.

The organisation mainly propagates the Hindu philosophy of Vedanta–Advaita Vedanta and four yogic ideals–jnana, bhakti, karma, and Raja Yoga.

Apart from religious and spiritual teaching, the organisation carries out educational and philanthropic work in India. The mission bases its work on the principles of karma yoga, the principle of selfless work done with a dedication to God. The Sri Sarada Math and its sister organisation, the Ramakrishna Sarada Mission, publish many important Vedanta and Ramakrishna-Vivekananda texts. Ramakrishna Sarada Mission, its sister organisation also shares the same headquarters at Dakshineshwar, Kolkata.

History 
2 December 1954, the Sarada Math was inaugurated by the then President of Ramakrishna Math and Ramakrishna Mission, Revered Swami Sankarananda. During its formative days, the women who joined this order was from a family of Sri Ramakrishna devotees, such as Brahmacharini Renu, Brahmacharini Asha, Brahmacharini Lakshmi, Brahmacharini Gauri, Brahmacharini Kalyani, and others.

Brahmacharini Asha had in 1946 written an article entitled, ‘Hindu Women’s Right to Sannyasa’ published in Udbodhan magazine, in which she expressed her strong desire for the life of renunciation. It created interest among intellectual circles, especially in the circles of Ramakrishna followers.

From 1954 to 1958, Sri Sarada Math was a branch centre of the Ramakrishna Math at Belur. The Trustees of Belur Math assumed the responsibility of its administration. However, only the inmates of the Sri Sarada Math conducted the day-to-day work of the Math. When the necessity arose, they sought advice from the senior monks of Belur Math. After the inaugural of the Sri Sarada Math, Swami the Belur Math authorities instructed that monks would no longer visit it without proper reason or prior permission.

In 1958, eight Brahmacharinis of the women's Math were tonsured, and they performed the Shraddha ceremony. Then on 2 January 1959, in the Old Shrine of Belur Math, the President, Swami Shankarananda and other senior monks conducted the Viraja Homa, and the eight Brahmacharinis were ordained into formal Sannyasa. They were given the ochre robes and new names. Swami Madhavananda had compiled the names. They would be prefixed by ‘Pravrajika’ and ended with ‘prana’. So the names of the eight pioneer sannyasinis were Pravrajika Bharatiprana, Pravrajika Mokshaprana, Pravrajika Muktiprana, Pravrajika Dayaprana, Pravrajika Vidyaprana, Pravrajika Shraddhaprana, Pravrajika Bhaktiprana, and Pravrajika Medhaprana.

On 26 August 1959, the Sri Sarada Math was recognised as an independent organisation and the full administration was handed over to the nuns. Seven of its nuns were elected to be the Trustees. The Trust deed was registered on 9 September 1959 and it was officially registered as a non-government trust on 11 September 1959. With this, the President of the Sri Sarada Math was also given the responsibility to give spiritual initiation (Mantra Diksha), brahmacharya initiation and the conferring of Sannyasa to eligible women. Thus, an independent Order of Sannyasinis was created.

Sri Sankaracharya did not sanction sannyasa for women. But Swami Vivekananda laid the foundation to admit women into the Puri Sampradaya, one of the ten Orders of the Dasanami Sampradaya started by Sankaracharya. Not only this but the nuns were also given the right to confer Sannyasa upon other women. This was an epoch-making incident in the history of the Hindu religion.

From the establishment of Sri Sarada Math in 1954 till it was legally independent in 1959, the total number of its members was 52. After that, many followers of Ramakrishna came forward to help. In May 1960, the Trustees of the Sri Sarada Math established the Ramakrishna Sarada Mission. The function of the Math gives emphasis on spiritual development (Atmano Mokshartham) while the Mission's main aim is service to society (Jagad Hitaya). Women with faith in this ideal can become members of the Mission.

Following the legal establishment of Ramakrishna Sarada Mission, the two institutions run by the Ramakrishna Mission for women, the Matri Bhavan (maternity hospital) in south Kolkata and the Entally Ashrama, Women's Welfare Centre in central Kolkata were handed over to Ramakrishna Sarada Mission in 1961.

With donations from Sri Devendranath Bhattacharya, the Ramakrishna Sarada Mission Vidyabhavan, a degree college was started in 1961. Later, some girls who received education at this college, have joined Sri Sarada Math and became nuns.

In 1963, the Ramakrishna Mission authorities handed over the Sister Nivedita Girls' School to the Ramakrishna Sarada Mission.

The Emblem and Motto 
The emblem of the Ramakrishna Math designed by Swami Vivekananda was slightly modified to keep a separate identity. In Sri Sarada Math's emblem, the swan and snake are facing the opposite direction. Two small lotus buds were added to the blooming lotus. The sun has almost completely risen.

The motto of Ramakrishna Math and Mission, ‘Atmano Mokshartham Jagad Hitaya Ca’ is also shared by Sri Sarada Math and Ramakrishna Sarada Mission.

The Presidents

Pravrajika Bharatiprana 
The first president of the Math was Pravrajika Bharatiprana (1894-1973). Formerly she was known as Sarala Devi, a disciple and personal attendant of Sri Sarada Devi. Following the guidance of her Guru and other disciples of Sri Ramakrishna, Sarala Devi lived in Varanasi from 1927 to 1954, performing spiritual disciplines. She received the Kaula Sannyasa and the name Sri Bharati from Swami Saradananda. Assuming the leadership of the Sri Sarada Math, Bharatiprana served from December 1954 to January 1973, till her Mahasamadhi.
Her life was written in Bengali as Bharatiprana Smriti Katha and later translated in English by Pravrajika Atmaprana as Pravrajika Bharatiprana.

Pravrajika Mokshaprana 
Pravrajika Mokshaprana (1915-1999) was the second President. She also served as the headmistress of Sister Nivedita's Girls' School from 1946 to 1948.

Pravrajika Muktiprana 
Pravrajika Muktiprana (1915-1994) was the first General Secretary of the Math. Her parents were disciples of Swami Shivananda, a direct disciple of Sri Ramakrishna. She actively participated in the movement that led to the formation of Sri Sarada Math. An excellent administrator, her biography on Sister Nivedita 'Bhagini Nivedita' is a masterpiece.

Pravrajika Shraddhaprana 
Pravrajika Shraddhaprana (1918-2009) was the third President. She, too, belonged to the first batch of Sannyasinis. She was a powerful speaker and writer. Her book 'Asamanya Patralekhikha Nivedita' contains selected translations of Sister Nivedita's letters.

Pravrajika Bhaktiprana 
Pravrajika Bhaktiprana (1920-2022) was the fourth President of Sri Sarada Math and Ramakrishna Sarada Mission. The President Mataji was assisted by vice president, Pravrajika Anandaprana and general secretary Pravrajika Amalaprana.

Pravrajika Anandaprana 
Pravrajika Anandaprana (1927-present) is the 5th president of Sri Sarada Math and Ramakrishna Sarada Mission.

She was born in 1927 in Kolkata. She received spiritual initiation from Swami Shankarananda,7th President of Belur Math. She joined the order in 1957 at Baghbazar Nivedita Girls' High School. She was elected a Trustee of the Math in 2017. In 2018 she became a Vice President of the Order.

On 14 January 2023, she was elected the 5th President of Sri Sarada Math and Ramakrishna Sarada Mission.

She is assisted by General Secretary,Pravrajika Amalaprana and Asst. General Secretaries, Pravrajika Jnanadaprana and Pravrajika Atandraprana

The Idea 
The idea to form a monastic institution for women was first envisioned by Swami Vivekananda, long before he established the well-known Ramakrishna Math. Swami Vivekananda realized the dire necessity of women's Math, which he expressed through his letters from 1894 to 1901.

“There is no chance for the welfare of the world unless the condition of women is improved… Hence it is that my first endeavor is to start a Math for women.”<ref>Letters of Swami Vivekananda (Advaita Ashrama: Mayavati, 1993), p.201 
</ref>

"Mother (Sri Sarada Devi) has been born to revive...Shakti in India; and making her the nucleus, once more will Gargis and Maitreyis be born into the world... Hence it is her Math that I want first... Without the grace of Shakti, nothing is to be accomplished.... Hence we must first build a Math for Mother.”

“Brother, in this terrible winter I am lecturing from place to place and fighting against odds, so that funds may be collected for Mother’s Math.”

“With the Holy Mother (Sri Sarada Devi) as the centre of inspiration, a Math is to be established on the eastern bank of the Ganga.”

“In the Women's Math there shall be no connection with monks, and in the Math for Men no connection with sadhavis.”

Swami Vivekananda wanted women to set right their own problems. He had known some of the women disciples of Sri Ramakrishna such as Gauri Ma, Yogin Ma, and Golap Ma. He wanted them to spread the message of Sri Ramakrishna through an organisation.

Sri Sarada Devi too, wanted to start a monastery for women. This came to light from the letters of Swami Saradananda written to Sara Bull, 'Sister Nivedita and myself have found out by talking to Mother that she would like to see a convent started in the fashion of the Math, Belur, for women. Miss Glen who was here to visit the Holy Mother also had a talk with Mother about it and is very sanguine about the work.'

Activities 
6 November 1981, the stone temple was consecrated as per the Hindu tradition. Daily ritual worships are performed here by the nuns. The birthdays of Sri Ramakrishna, Sri Sarada Devi, Swami Vivekananda, and other personalities are celebrated here, besides the Hindu festivals. Religious discourse and lectures are also done regularly.

The training of brahmacharinis and novices are an essential activity of the Sri Sarada Math.

Sri Sarada Math also has some speakers on Vedanta and Hinduism who have been travelling the various parts of the world to deliver lectures, talks, and discourses. To name a few, Pravrajika Ajayaprana Mataji, Pravrajika Divyanandaprana, are some well-known nuns of Sri Sarada Math.

In the fields of education, health, women's development, the nuns of the Sri Sarada Math are also are providing services for example,  Ramakrishna Sarada Mission Vivekananda Vidyabhavan and Ramakrishna Sarada Mission Sister Nivedita Girls' School.

Branch Centres 
Sri Sarada Math has since its inception spread to several parts of the world. The sadhavis, though small in numbers, have been contributing significantly through their selfless activities.

Ramakrishna Sarada Vedanta Society of New South Wales 
A branch centre was opened in New South Wales, and Pravrajika Ajayaprana became its president from 1982 to 2011. Currently, the centre is led by Pravrajika Gayatriprana.

Publications 
Nibodhata, is the Bengali journal, published every two months. It contains articles on various matters related to religion, science, art, culture, society, history.

Samvit is the English journal published by Sri Sarada Math's New Delhi Center. Samvit was first published in 1980, through the efforts of Revered Pravrajika Muktiprana, the first General Secretary of Sri Sarada Math and Ramakrishna Sarada Mission. The journal covers various religious and spiritual issues.

Besides journals, the Sri Sarada Math and its branch centres also have published several biographies of religious and spiritual personalities, and books on Ramakrishna-Vedanta.

References

External links 
 Sri Sarada Math, Dakshineswar, Kolkata
 Rasik Bhita
 You are being redirected...
 Ramakrishna Sarada Mission Sister Nivedita Girls School, Kolkata, West Bengal, India

Hindu new religious movements
Ramakrishna Mission
Hindu organisations based in India
Hindu monasteries in India
Hindu religious orders